Baseball Sask  is the provincial governing body for baseball in Saskatchewan.

References

Sports organizations established in 1959
Baseball
Baseball governing bodies in Canada
1959 establishments in Saskatchewan